Cartoon Network is one of two digital children's television channels that air animated series: Cartoon Network Middle East and North Africa (MENA), which serves the Middle East and North Africa division along with Cyprus; and Cartoon Network Africa (formerly known as Cartoon Network EMEA), which exclusively serves Sub-Saharan Africa. Both feeds are owned by Warner Bros. Discovery under its International division.

The network began as part of the larger UK/pan-European service on 17 September 1993; the UK branch would separate itself in October 1999, but kept a nearly identical schedule until August 2001.

Cartoon Network EMEA used to share channel space with TNT Africa; the latter would air from 21:00 to 06:00 CET, while the former would run for the rest of the day.

On 1 July 2016, an HD feed on beIN known as Cartoon Network MENA was launched, replacing Cartoon Network Africa in the MENA region. It features both English and Arabic audio tracks. In addition to being offered by various Gulf IPTV providers (as well as Cablevision in Lebanon and most Cypriot TV providers except for Nova), Cartoon Network MENA also has a different management team, different branding and a fully separate schedule from Cartoon Network Africa.

History

The pan-European feed launched on 17 September 1993 as Cartoon Network UK/Europe, broadcasting all over the continent in English. A Spanish-language audio track was added on 4 March 1994, along with those in Swedish, Danish, French, Italian and Norwegian.

The Benelux feed launched on 12 July 1997. In June 1998, the Southern European feed (serving France, Italy, and Spain) also debuted. A Polish feed launched on 1 September 1998.

The Italian feed became independent a few months after the launch of the Southern European feed, while the Spanish and French feeds split on 23 August 1999.

On 15 October 1999, the UK feed officially separated from the pan-European version, during the time when the shared transponder analog feed on Astra 1C became scrambled with VideoCrypt, and when the short-lived British version of TNT launched.

The Nordic feed (serving Denmark, Sweden, Norway, Iceland, and Finland) was launched on 1 January 2000, with fully localized audio tracks especially for Denmark, Sweden and Norway.

The Benelux Cartoon Network ceased broadcast on 31 July 2001, replaced by the pan-European feed and Dutch audio track the following day. Also on that day, the UK feed became completely independent of the pan-European feed.

The Polish feed added Romanian and Hungarian audio tracks on 30 September 2002. A Russian audio track was added on 1 April 2005, and Greek subtitles were added on 20 June 2005.

The German feed launched on 5 December 2006, followed by the Turkish feed on 28 January 2008. On 1 October 2008, a feed for Hungary and Romania was split off from the Polish feed; the former later began to serve the Czech Republic and Slovakia.

The Russian and Bulgarian feed launched on 1 October 2009.

The African website, CartoonNetworkAfrica.com, launched in 2010. Since the website redesign on 7 August 2014, it along with the other Cartoon Network website now.

Cartoon Network Arabic launched on 10 October 2010, as the only EMEA feed that is completely unavailable in English.

The Benelux feed relaunched in November that year, with the Dutch audio track removed from the pan-European feed at the same time.

The Spanish feed closed down on 1 July 2013 along with the Spanish Cartoonito; programs from both networks can still be viewed on Boing (which carries all CN shows in a block titled ¡Findes! Cartoon Network).

A European Portuguese feed launched on 1 October 2013 in Angola and Mozambique, before arriving in Portugal on 3 December.

Cartoon Network EMEA switched to widescreen on 6 October 2014, and also rebranded with the CHECK It 3.0 graphics package on that same day.

In December 2015, Turner Broadcasting System Arabia entered an exclusive deal with beIN Media Group to supply the Arab world with all of the former's pay TV channels via the latter's beIN Channels Network subscription service (including Cartoon Network, Boomerang and Turner Classic Movies) starting on 1 January 2016. This consequently removed Cartoon Network and other Turner-owned channels from OSN's broadcast services from 16 January 2016 onwards, though subscribers to Etisalat and Du's respective pay TV services in the UAE were unaffected.

On 1 July 2016, Cartoon Network MENA was launched to replace the African feed in the Arab world, broadcasting in 1080i HD with an Arabic audio track. The service features a different schedule, program line-up, and censorship rules (sometimes editing scenes which are untouched on the Arabic feed). It is also offered with Greek subtitles in Cyprus, effectively ending Cartoon Network EMEA's status as a pan-feed.

Cartoon Network MENA's English-language website can be found at CartoonNetworkME.com, Another site, CartoonNetworkMENA.com, launched around the same time and serves as a hub where users can choose between the English- or Arabic-language versions.

In June 2017, the Kenya Film Classification Board (KCFB), headed by CEO Ezekiel Mutua, ordered a ban on six cartoons airing on Cartoon Network Africa, Nickelodeon Africa and Nicktoons Africa for allegedly promoting LGBT themes to minors. The shows affected were the Cartoon Network shows Adventure Time, Clarence and Steven Universe, in addition to the Nickelodeon/Nicktoons shows Hey Arnold!, The Legend of Korra and The Loud House. The ban appears to have been largely unenforced, however.

On 18 December 2018, Cartoon Network Africa switched to high definition.

In an interview with C21 in May 2021, WarnerMedia EMEA mentioned that they're looking to add programs for girls and family which consist of live-action and animated series.

Logos

Sister channels

TNT Africa

Unlike other counterparts, TNT Africa is a movie channel that launched in Turner Classic Movies's place and inherited some of its offering. As of January 2021, AEW Dynamite airs on the channel.

Boomerang

Boomerang is a television channel which airs cartoons. Two versions of the channel exist; one for the Arab World, Greece and Cyprus (Boomerang MENA), and another for Sub-Saharan Africa (Boomerang Africa). It launched on 5 June 2005 as Boomerang EMEA.

On 1 July 2016, Boomerang MENA was launched, replacing the African feed in the Middle East and North Africa; it airs in 1080i with English and Arabic audio tracks on beIN, and is also available in Greece and Cyprus, albeit with a Greek audio track.

Cartoonito 
The morning Cartoonito block launched on 4 April 2022.

Boing

Boing is a television channel that airs repeats of programs formerly seen on Cartoon Network and Boomerang. It launched on 30 May 2015, as the fourth extension of Turner's larger Boing brand.

Toonami
Toonami is a television channel catered towards young adults consisting of DC animation from Batman, Superman and Young Justice. It launched in 2017 on Kwesé TV until the platform went defunct in 2019. Then it was made available on Cell C's defunct streaming service Black for that same year.

In March 2020, the channel was revived as a 2-month pop-up channel on DStv thereafter it was made available full-time on the StarTimes platform after its closure. As of March 2021, Toonami can also be found on Canal+, Intelvision, Azam TV and Zuku TV.

Discovery Channel

Discovery Channel, also commercially abbreviated and trademarked as Discovery, is a subscription television channel that airs documentaries related to popular science, technology and history. In a similar format to National Geographic and History Channel. Also in the DStv platform on channel 121.

Discovery Family
Unlike its american counterpart but much like its french counterpart, Discovery Family is a family-oriented specialty TV channel that launched in Discovery World's place and inherited some of its offering.

Food Network
Food Network is a television channel that focuses on both special and regular episodic programs about food and cooking.

HGTV
HGTV is a South African television channel on DStv that primarily airs broadcasts reality programming related to home improvement and real estate.

Investigation Discovery

Investigation Discovery is a television channel dedicated to true crime documentaries.

Real Time

Real Time is a television channel that airs lifestyle programming targeting to a female upper-class audience.

TLC
TLC is a lifestyle television channel which airs reality shows involving lifestyles, family life and personal stories.

OWN 
The OWN programming block used to be airing on October 17, 2013, But the block was discontinued a few years later.

Travel Channel

Travel Channel is an African television channel that features documentaries, reality, and how-to shows related to travel and leisure around the world. It also airs shows focusing on African animal safaris, tours of grand hotels and resorts, visits to significant cities and towns around the world, programming about various foods around the world, and programming about ghosts and the paranormal in notable buildings.

See also

Cartoon Network around the world
Boomerang (Middle Eastern and African TV channel)
TNT Africa
List of programs broadcast by Cartoon Network

References

External links
Site that allows users to choose between Cartoon Network Arabic's website or that of Cartoon Network MENA
Official Middle East website (in English)
Africa website

Greece website

Children's television networks
Middle East and Africa
Television channels and stations established in 1993
Television channels and stations established in 1999
Television channels and stations established in 2016
Television stations in South Africa
Television channels in Greece
Television channels in Cyprus
Mass media in Dubai